Crooked Tree Wild Life Sanctuary (CTWS)  is a protected area in Belize. It is recognized as a Wetland of International Importance. It was designated as a waterfowl habitat on April 22, 1998, under the Ramsar Convention on Wetlands. During Belize's dry season many resident and migratory birds find refuge in the lagoons. The sanctuary contains  of lagoons, creeks, log wood swamps, broad leaf forest and pine savanna, home to hundreds of species of wildlife. The sanctuary protects globally endangered species including the Central American river turtle (locally known as hicatee), Mexican black howler monkey, and yellow-headed parrot.

The Jabiru stork is Crooked Tree's most famous resident. Belize has the largest nesting population of these great birds in all of Central America. Jabiru storks arrive in November to nest in the lowland pine savannas. Two pairs of Jabiru storks are known to nest within the Sanctuary. After the young fledge, in April and May, the birds from the northern and central parts of Belize congregate at Crooked Tree Lagoons. When the rains come, the birds leave to return again the following November.

History 
In March 1972, per the request of the Belize Audubon Society and with the approval of the Government of Belize, Dr. Alexander Sprunt IV, Head of the U.S. National Audubon Society Field Office, came to Belize to assess Crooked Tree and make recommendations about its creation as a wading bird reserve. In July he submitted his report and proposal for the establishment of a Natural Area Reserve at Crooked Tree Lagoon. Jabiru stork protection was the Belize Audubon Society's first advocacy project. In 1973 the Jabiru stork was added to Belize's list of protected animals. Crooked Tree Wildlife Sanctuary, the first Wildlife Sanctuary declared by the Government of Belize, was gazetted on December 8, 1984.

On August 22, 1998, Crooked Tree Wildlife Sanctuary was declared Belize's first Ramsar site based on the wetland's significance, especially as waterfowl habitat.

Location 
Bus services are available (Monday to Saturday) from Belize City to Crooked Tree Village.

Goal 
The main goal of the Crooked Tree Wild Life sanctuary is to protect the area for the thousands of water birds that migrate each and every year.

References

Protected areas of Belize
Ramsar sites in Belize